Frank Charles Osmers Jr. (December 30, 1907 – May 21, 1977) was an American Republican Party politician who represented New Jersey's 9th congressional district in the United States House of Representatives from 1939–1943 and again from 1951-1965.

Biography
He was born in Leonia, New Jersey on December 30, 1907. Osmers attended the local public schools and Williams College, Williamstown, Massachusetts. He was engaged in the jewelry business.

Osmers was a member of the Haworth, New Jersey Borough Council from 1930–1934 and served as Mayor of Haworth, New Jersey in 1935 and 1936. He was a member of the New Jersey General Assembly from 1935–1937, and was elected as a Republican to the Seventy-sixth and to the Seventy-seventh Congress, serving in office from January 3, 1939 – January 3, 1943.

While a member of the Seventy-seventh Congress, Osmers enlisted as a private and graduated from the Infantry School at Fort Benning, Georgia, as a second lieutenant. He was placed on the inactive list by Presidential directive and finished his term in Congress, but was not a candidate for reelection in 1942 to the Seventy-eighth Congress.

Osmers went on active duty as a second lieutenant in the Seventy-seventh Infantry Division on January 4, 1943, transferred to the Twenty-fourth Corps and served in the Pacific, and was discharged on February 22, 1946. He served as a major in Officers’ Reserve Corps.

After he returned from his military service, Osmers resumed his former business pursuits and was also interested in real estate, insurance, and publishing businesses. He was elected as a Republican to the Eighty-second Congress, by special election on November 6, 1951, to fill the vacancy caused by the resignation of Harry L. Towe, and was reelected to the six succeeding Congresses, serving from November 6, 1951, to January 3, 1965. Osmers voted in favor of the Civil Rights Acts of 1957, 1960, and 1964, and the 24th Amendment to the U.S. Constitution. He was an unsuccessful candidate for reelection in 1964 to the Eighty-ninth Congress, and was again unsuccessful in his bid for office in 1966 to the Ninetieth Congress, both times losing to Democrat Henry Helstoski by 51% to 49% margins.

He was executive administrator, Bergen County, New Jersey from 1968–1970 and engaged in a real estate business in Englewood, New Jersey.

He resided in Tenafly, New Jersey, where he died on May 21, 1977, and was interred in Brookside Cemetery in Englewood, New Jersey.

References

External links

Frank Charles Osmers Jr. at The Political Graveyard

 

1907 births
1977 deaths
Mayors of places in New Jersey
Republican Party members of the New Jersey General Assembly
People from Haworth, New Jersey
People from Leonia, New Jersey
People from Tenafly, New Jersey
Politicians from Bergen County, New Jersey
Williams College alumni
Republican Party members of the United States House of Representatives from New Jersey
Burials at Brookside Cemetery (Englewood, New Jersey)
20th-century American politicians